Romain-Pierre Charpentier (born 12 July 1951 in Paris), known professionally as Romain Goupil, is a French filmmaker. He was a college leader during the May 1968 civil unrest in France and was for a long time a trotskyist militant. During the 2000s decade he aligned with the positions of the Cercle de l'Oratoire, and supported Emmanuel Macron in 2017.

Early life  
Romain Goupil was born in an artist family. His father, Pierre Goupil (born in 1930), was a cinematographer. His grandmother, Lita Recio (1906-2006), was an actor well known for dubbing. She was married to singer Robert Charpentier, named Goupil (1896-1938). Romain Goupil lived in the Cité Montmartre-aux-artistes, where his grandparents also lived.

Political Engagement 
Romain Goupil is a public figure known in France for his political engagement since his teenage years. He retraced his early engagement in militant groups in his first feature-length film "Mourir à trente ans" using his personal archives and interviews of militant who took part in the event of May 1968. 
Romain Goupil is then know to often appear on television to discuss in public debates. From 2017 onwards he publicly support the candidacy of Emmanuel Macron.

Filmography 
 1968 : L'Exclu (short film)
 1969 : Ibizarre (short film)
 1975 : Setúbal, ville rouge
 1980 : Le Père Goupil (short film)
 1982 : Mourir à trente ans
 1983 : La Java des ombres
 1990 : Maman
 1994 : Lettre pour L...
 1994 : Paris est à nous
 1999 : À mort la mort !
 2002 : Une pure coïncidence
 2010 : Les Mains en l'air
 2014 : Les Jours venus
 2018 : La Traversée

References

1951 births
Film directors from Paris
Living people